"It's Yours" is a song by American R&B singer J. Holiday. It was released on December 16, 2008, as the first and only single from his second studio album, Round 2 (2009). The single features production from The Co-Stars (Teairra Mari's Make Her Feel Good), and Jasper Cameron (Lloyd's Player's Prayer).

The song was well received, becoming the most added single at Urban Mainstream radio the week of December 13, 2008.

Track listing

Music video
The music video premiered on Yahoo and it was directed by Jonathan Mannion. It appeared at #78 on BET's Notarized: Top 100 Videos of 2009 countdown.

Charts

Weekly charts

Year-end charts

Release history
United States - December 16, 2008 - Digital download

United States - January 26, 2009 - Rhymitic radio

References

2008 songs
2008 singles
2009 singles
J. Holiday songs
Capitol Records singles
Songs written by Jasper Cameron